WZRV (95.3 FM) is a classic hits formatted broadcast radio station.  The station is licensed to Front Royal, Virginia and serves the Northern Shenandoah Valley in Virginia.  WZRV is owned and operated by Royal Broadcasting, Inc.

References

External links
The River 95-3 Online

1981 establishments in Virginia
Classic hits radio stations in the United States
Radio stations established in 1981
ZRV